Fanny by Gaslight may be:

Fanny by Gaslight (novel), novel by Michael Sadleir
Fanny by Gaslight (film), a 1944 film adaptation
Fanny by Gaslight (TV series), a 1981 BBC adaptation